Boophis tephraeomystax is a species of frog in the family Mantellidae endemic to Madagascar. Its natural habitats are subtropical or tropical dry forests, subtropical or tropical moist lowland forests, moist savanna, subtropical or tropical moist shrubland, rivers, intermittent freshwater marshes, arable land, urban areas, heavily degraded former forests, and seasonally flooded agricultural land.

References

tephraeomystax
Endemic frogs of Madagascar
Amphibians described in 1853
Taxa named by André Marie Constant Duméril
Taxonomy articles created by Polbot